Tagnin is an Italian surname. Notable people with the surname include:

Carlo Tagnin (1932–2000), Italian footballer and manager
Carlotta Tagnin (born 1965), Italian swimmer

Italian-language surnames